The award for People's Choice: Favorite International Video is an award presented at the MuchMusic Video Awards. The award can only be presented to an artist or group that did not originate from Canada. The results are decided by an online poll. The award was first handed out at the 2008 MuchMusic Video Awards. Formerly there were separate award categories for international groups and artists, "Peoples Choice: Favourite International Group" and "Peoples Choice: Favourite International Artist". Those award categories are now defunct due to the "People's Choice: Favourite International Video" which includes international groups as well as international solo artists. The first award was given in 2008 to Fall Out Boy's "The Take Over, The Break's Over" music video.

Winners

References

MuchMusic Video Awards